Noble Park North is a suburb in Melbourne, Victoria, Australia, 25 km south-east of Melbourne's Central Business District, located within the City of Greater Dandenong local government area.

Noble Park North is bounded in the west by the edge of the Springvale Crematorium, in the north by Police Road, in the east by Bakers Road, Halton Road and Eastlink, and in the southwest by the Princes Highway.

Education

Carwatha College P-12 is a state co-educational school in the suburb.

Silverton Primary is the local government school. 

Nazareth College is a Catholic secondary school.

Sport

The suburb has an Australian Rules football team, Lyndale Football Club and Silverton Football Club, competing in the Southern Football League.

The Silverton Bakers is the local cricket club which has both a junior and senior program. 

Empowered Martial Arts trains at Silverton Primary school.

See also
 City of Dandenong – Parts of Noble Park North were previously within this former local government area.
 City of Springvale – Parts of Noble Park North were previously within this former local government area.

References

Suburbs of Melbourne
Suburbs of the City of Greater Dandenong